Kaj Leo Holm Johannesen (born 28 August 1964 in Tórshavn) is a Faroese politician. He was the prime minister of the Faroe Islands, representing the Faroese Unionist Party (Sambandsflokkurin). He took office, succeeding Jóannes Eidesgaard on 26 September 2008 and left office on 15 September 2015, after his party and coalition with Fólkaflokkurin and Miðflokkurin lost the general election on 1 September 2015. Johannesen is also a former international football player; he was goalkeeper for the Faroe Islands national football team.

In the Faroese parliamentary elections, held on 29 October 2011 Kaj Leo Johannesen received 1979 personal votes. This is the largest number of personal votes ever given to a Faroese parliament candidate. He held this record until the general election 2015, when Aksel V. Johannesen received 2405 personal votes. At the same election Kaj Leo Johannesen received 603 personal votes.

Member of the City Council of Tórshavn 
Kaj Leo Johannesen was a member of the City Council of Tórshavn 1997–2000, representing the Faroese Unionist Party (Sambandsflokkurin).

Football career 
Kaj Leo Johannesen was a football goalkeeper and received 4 full international caps for the Faroes. He made his debut as a half-time substitute in a Euro 1992 qualifying game against eventual winners Denmark in Landskrona, Sweden, which served as Faroes' home ground during their very first international qualifying tournament. He played all 90 minutes in his other international matches, including the first ever competitive game, played on the Faroes, on 3 June 1992 at Svangaskarð, Toftir against Belgium in 1994 FIFA World Cup qualification.

He was unused substitute in 18 FIFA registered international matches in the period between 1989 and 1995. Kaj Leo was kept on the bench in most international matches by the "Bobble Hat" goalkeeper Jens Martin Knudsen, also in the Euro 1992 qualifying 1–0 victory over Austria in Landskrona, Sweden on 12 September 1990.

Club Football career 
Kaj Leo Johannesen played as first choice goalkeeper for one of the strongest Faroese clubs, HB Tórshavn between 1984 and 1998, and made some comebacks in later years. He became champion of the Faroese League in 1988, 1990 and 1998.

Handball Player for Kyndil 
Kaj Leo Johannesen is also a former handball player. He played 163 matches for Kyndil and scored 625 goals for the club.

References

External links 
 Logting.fo, The Prime Minister of the Faroe Islands
 Football.fo
 Torshavn.fo
 HB.fo
 Kyndil.fo
 Profile on FaroeSoccer.com

1964 births
Living people
Faroese footballers
Association football goalkeepers
Members of the Løgting
Faroe Islands international footballers
Prime Ministers of the Faroe Islands
Havnar Bóltfelag players
Faroese male handball players
Faroese sportsperson-politicians
Union Party (Faroe Islands) politicians
21st-century Danish politicians
People from Tórshavn